In the 2014–15 Arminia Bielefeld season, Arminia Bielefeld will participate in the 3. Liga, the third tier in German football, and the DFB Pokal, the German cup competition.

Competitions

3. Liga

League table

Matches

DFB-Pokal

References

Arminia Bielefeld
Arminia Bielefeld seasons